The Impatient Patient is a 1942 Warner Bros. Looney Tunes cartoon directed by Norman McCabe. The cartoon was released on September 5, 1942, and stars Daffy Duck. The film is set in a mad scientist's laboratory.

This cartoon was colorized in 1968 (just after Seven Arts Productions, successor to Guild Films, to whom the TV distribution rights to the black-and-white cartoon library had been sold some time before, acquired Warner Bros.) by having every other frame traced over onto a cel. Each redrawn cel was painted in color and then photographed over a colored reproduction of each original background. The animation quality dropped considerably from the original version with this method. The cartoon was colorized again in 1992, this time with a computer adding color to a new print of the original black and white cartoon. This preserved the quality of the original animation (the end result also resembled the actual color cartoons released around the same time).

Adding to the medical theme, the signatures of the personnel credited (McCabe, writer Don Christensen, animator Veve Risto and music composer Carl Stalling) were featured in the opening credits, just as a doctor would sign a prescription.

Plot
While traipsing through the Ookaboochie Swamps, Daffy Duck seeks to deliver a telegram to "Chloe". Unable to find the telegram's recipient, and suffering from a severe case of hiccups, he stumbles upon the home of "Dr. Jerkyl" and hopes that the physician can cure his condition. Daffy's hiccups are so severe that they cause him to damage or destroy everything around him.

Dr. Jerkyl captures Daffy and restrains him to a doctor's chair. Hoping to scare Daffy in order to cure his hiccups, Dr. Jerkyl created and drinks a potion that turns him into Chloe, a grotesque yet effeminate ogre. Daffy, realizing he has reached his destination, then reads Chloe the telegram: the lyrics to "Happy Birthday To You" (albeit spoken and not sung), sent to her by a Mr. Frank N. Stein.

Chloe, who is enamored with Daffy (who in turn is now cured of his hiccups), chases the duck around the laboratory until the radio is accidentally switched on, prompting him/her to dance. Once the music ends, the chase resumes. Daffy scrambles to the lab table and mixes a potion, which turns Chloe into an infant. As each brandishes a hammer insisting each one doesn't know the other that well (doing imitations of Red Skelton's "Mean Widdle Kid" character), the action moves offscreen, a large thud is heard, and the bird from the doctor's cuckoo clock displays a large sign reading “He Dood It!”

References

1942 films
1942 animated films
1942 short films
1940s animated short films
Dr. Jekyll and Mr. Hyde films
Looney Tunes shorts
Warner Bros. Cartoons animated short films
Mad scientist films
Daffy Duck films
Films scored by Carl Stalling
Films directed by Norman McCabe
1940s Warner Bros. animated short films